The 2005 1000 km of Monza was the second round of the 2005 Le Mans Series season and held at Autodromo Nazionale Monza.  It was run on July 10, 2005.

Official results

Class winners in bold.  Cars failing to complete 70% of winner's distance marked as Not Classified (NC).

Statistics
 Pole Position - #15 Zytek Motorsport - 1:47.744
 Fastest Lap - #15 Zytek Motorsport - 1:39.437
 Average Speed - 198.756 km/h

External links

 World Sports Racing Prototypes - 2005 1000 km of Monza results

M
6 Hours of Monza
Monza